"Pitch in on a Party" is a song by American rapper and producer DJ Quik, released as the first single from his fifth studio album Balance & Options.

Track listings
U.S. CD Single 
"Pitch in ona Party" (Radio Mix) – 3:58
"Pitch in ona Party" (Instrumental) – 3:58
"Call Out Research Hook" – 0:10

U.S. Promo Vinyl 
"Pitch in ona Party" (Club Mix) – 4:07
"Pitch in ona Party" (Acapella) – 3:23
"Do I Love Her?" (feat. Suga Free) (Acapella) – 4:15

Charts

References 

1999 singles
1999 songs
Arista Records singles
DJ Quik songs
Song recordings produced by DJ Quik
Songs written by DJ Quik